Mu Sigma Rho is the US national statistics honor society.

History
Founded in 1968 at Iowa State University, Mu Sigma Rho seeks to promote and encourage scholarly activity in statistics, and to recognize outstanding achievement among students and faculty thereof. Its activities include outreach and professional service.

The Society publishes an occasional newsletter, the Mu Sigma Rhover.

See also 
 Kappa Mu Epsilon,  (mathematics)
 Mu Alpha Theta,  (mathematics, high school)
 Pi Mu Epsilon,  (mathematics)

External links 
 Mu Sigma Rho and the College Bowl

References 

Student organizations established in 1968
Honor societies
Statistical organizations in the United States
1968 establishments in Iowa